Sandown Park railway station is located on the Pakenham and Cranbourne lines in Victoria, Australia. It serves the south-eastern Melbourne suburb of Springvale, and it opened in 1889 as Oakleigh Racecourse. It was renamed Sandown Park in 1892.

History

Named after Sandown Park in Surrey, England, the station was built to service the nearby Sandown Racecourse. In addition to the two main lines, there was a signal box and booking office, and two sidings each over 600 metres long on the eastern side of the tracks, for the stabling of special race services. The station had no platform on the Up track, instead having an island platform on the Down track, with the other face serving one of the sidings on the eastern side. By 1937, a crossover at the Down end of the station was removed and, in 1943, the sidings that adjoined the back platform were abolished.

The station was only used for racecourse traffic, and was closed on 16 May 1955. In June 1965, it reopened as an island platform for passengers on race days only. It was opened for general passenger traffic in October of that year. The station once had a second exit and a pedestrian underpass at the Up end of the platform, but that has since been closed and filled in.

Nearby, towards Noble Park, the Corrigan Road level crossing was removed in 2018, as part of the Victorian Government's Level Crossing Removal Project (LXRP).

Platforms and services

Sandown Park has one island platform with two faces. It is serviced by Metro Trains' Pakenham and Cranbourne line services.

Platform 1:
  all stations and limited express services to Flinders Street
  all stations and limited express services to Flinders Street

Platform 2:
  all stations and limited express services to Pakenham
  all stations services to Cranbourne

Future services:
In addition to the current services the Network Development Plan Metropolitan Rail proposes linking the Pakenham and Cranbourne lines to both the Sunbury line and under-construction Melbourne Airport rail link via the Metro Tunnel.
  express services to West Footscray and Sunbury (2025 onwards)
  express services to Melbourne Airport (2029 onwards)

References

External links
 Melway map at street-directory.com.au

Railway stations in Melbourne
Railway stations in Australia opened in 1889
Railway stations in the City of Greater Dandenong